"Can't Nobody Love You (Like I Do)" is a song recorded by American country music artist Wynonna.  It was released in November 1999 as the first single from the album New Day Dawning.  The song reached #31 on the Billboard Hot Country Singles & Tracks chart.  The song was written by Danny Orton and Cathy Majeski.

Chart performance

References

1999 singles
1999 songs
Wynonna Judd songs
Songs written by Cathy Majeski
Songs written by Danny Orton
Song recordings produced by James Stroud
Mercury Records singles
Curb Records singles